Spanning tree is a term in the mathematical field of graph theory

Spanning tree may also refer to:

 Spanning tree protocol, a network protocol for Ethernet networks
Multiple Spanning Tree Protocol

See also

Minimum spanning tree
Capacitated minimum spanning tree
Distributed minimum spanning tree
Euclidean minimum spanning tree
k-minimum spanning tree
Kinetic minimum spanning tree
Random minimum spanning tree
Rectilinear minimum spanning tree
Degree-constrained spanning tree
Maximum leaf spanning tree
Minimum degree spanning tree
Shortest total path length spanning tree
Kruskal's algorithm, a minimum-spanning-tree algorithm